Raynauth Jeffrey (born 22 May 1994, in Georgetown) is a Guyanese cyclist. He is a two time national road race champion and an eight time national time trial champion of Guyana. He is married with a daughter.

Major results

2012
 2nd Road Race, National Road Championships
2013
 National Road Championships
1st  Time Trial 
1st  Road Race
2014
 National Road Championships
1st  Time Trial 
3rd Road Race
2016
 National Road Championships
1st  Time Trial 
2nd Road Race
 National Under-23 Road Championships
1st  Time Trial 
1st  Road Race 
2017
 National Road Championships
1st  Time Trial 
1st  Road Race
 4th Tobago Cycling Classic
2018
 1st  Time Trial, National Road Championships
2019
 1st  Time Trial, National Road Championships
2021
 1st  Time Trial, National Road Championships

References 

1994 births
Living people
Sportspeople from Georgetown, Guyana
Cyclists at the 2014 Commonwealth Games
Commonwealth Games competitors for Guyana
Guyanese male cyclists